John Lewis Said (1932 – January 5, 2019) served as Bishop Suffragan in the Episcopal Diocese of Southeast Florida (1995–2003) and Assistant Bishop in the Episcopal Diocese of Central Florida (2003–2018).

Said was born in Marion, Indiana, in 1932. He studied at Wabash College and Yale Divinity School. He was ordained deacon in 1958 and priest in 1959. He then served parishes in Indiana and Florida. He also served as a missionary in Brazil from 1966 to 1969. In 1984 he became rector of St Kevin's Church in Opa-locka, Florida. In 1987, he joined the Brotherhood of St. Andrew.

On October 29, 1994, he was elected Suffragan Bishop of Southeast Florida and was consecrated to the episcopate on February 25, 1995, by Presiding Bishop Edmond L. Browning. He served in that post until 2003 when he became Assistant Bishop of Central Florida. He also served as bishop in residence at the Church of the Nativity in Port St. Lucie, Florida. He died in Port St. Lucie, Florida, after a lengthy illness.

References 

Episcopal Clerical Directory 2017

1932 births
2019 deaths
People from Marion, Indiana
Wabash College alumni
Yale Divinity School alumni
20th-century American Episcopalians
Episcopal bishops of Central Florida